is a meteoroid discovered on 4 February 2011 by Richard A. Kowalski, at the Catalina Sky Survey. On the same day the meteoroid passed within 0.85 Earth radii of Earth's surface, and was perturbed from the Apollo class to the Aten class of near-Earth objects. With a relative velocity of only 9.7 km/s, had the asteroid passed less than 0.5 Earth radii from Earth's surface, it would have fallen as a brilliant fireball. The meteoroid was removed from the Sentry Risk Table on 5 February 2011.

It was not until 2020 QG on 16 August 2020 that a non-impacting closer approach to Earth was observed.

See also

References

External links 
 Tiny Asteroid Zips Close By Earth space.com 6 February 2011
 Asteroid makes sharpest turn yet seen in solar system New Scientist 9 February 2011
 Asteroid's Record-Breaking Brush with Earth Changed It Forever Space.com 23 February 2011
 
 
 

Minor planet object articles (unnumbered)

20110204
20110204